Bandana Square, formerly the Como Shops of the Northern Pacific Railway, is currently an office center. However, it was initially designed to be an Shopping Mall in the Energy Park neighborhood of Saint Paul, Minnesota. The site is on the National Register of Historic Places.

History

The complex opened in 1984 after the former Northern Pacific Railway's Como Shops were converted into what was to be a large festival marketplace and hotel complex. The financing and cooperation came from the railroads, the government, and private grants.

A Best Western hotel and conference center remains at Bandana Square. When Bandana originally opened, the complex was home to various restaurants, such as the Dakota Jazz Club and Restaurant. The Dakota moved to Downtown Minneapolis in 2003. The Dino's Greek fast-food chain also had its first year-round restaurant at Bandana Square (previously, the company had only set up stands at the Minnesota State Fair and other events).

The center was purchased by the Saint Paul-based Wilder Foundation in 1983 for $17 million. By 1989, the foundation had lost $9 million and sought help from the Saint Paul Port Authority. The project had become a financial drain to the foundation and was detracting from its mission to help children and at-risk families. At that time, only 65% of the space was occupied. The Port Authority proposed a plan that would save the Wilder Foundation $780,000 a year, but the Port Authority took over the center in March 1989. The port authority sold it to investors for $3 million who tried to refocus it as a regional retail and entertainment center. Wellington Management bought the center in 2003 for $6.1 million. The center was converted entirely to offices in 2006.

The Minnesota Children's Museum was located in a building close to Bandana Square from 1985 until 1995 when it moved to Downtown Saint Paul.

The Twin City Model Railroad Museum was located in Bandana Square from 1984 until 2016 when it moved to a new St. Paul location. The museum was the last remaining tenant from the original renovation of the facility into a shopping and entertainment district.

See also 
 Galtier Plaza, a similar development in Saint Paul
 Saint Anthony Main, a similar development in Minneapolis

References

External links

 Wellington Management: Bandana Square

Shopping malls established in 1984
Historic districts on the National Register of Historic Places in Minnesota
National Register of Historic Places in Saint Paul, Minnesota
Shopping malls in Minnesota
Northern Pacific Railway
Railroad museums in Minnesota
Museums in Saint Paul, Minnesota
Railway buildings and structures on the National Register of Historic Places in Minnesota